Aquaman: The Becoming is a six-issue comic book miniseries that were published by DC Comics from September 2021 to February 2022.

Synopsis 
The series follows Aqualad, who is accused of blowing up Aquaman's training facility and must prove his innocence.

Issues

Reception 
Henry Varona from Comic Book Resources called last issue a "satisfying end to Jackson Hyde's first solo series". Reviewer from Bleeding Cool gave first issue 7.5 rating and wrote "a strong setting and some epic performances by supporting characters establish a great foundation for a new generation of stories".

Awards

References 

2021 comics debuts
2022 comics endings
DC Comics limited series